Nowen Hill   is a  tall hill in County Cork, Ireland.

Transmitter
Nowen Hill is the home to the main transmitter of local radio services in Cork to West Cork. Due to the difficult terrain of the service area, transmissions from Nowen Hill are much more powerful than other transmitters in Cork, and even with the much more powerful transmissions, there are a number of blackspots in the transmitter's coverage area. Relays to fill these blackspots exist in Macroom, Bantry, Clonakilty, Kinsale,

Nowen Hill was also home to a MMDS transmitter.

Relays

Macroom

Clonakilty

References

External links

  Nowen Hill at mountainviews.ie

Marilyns of Ireland
Mountains and hills of County Cork